Cape Opmarai Airfield is a disused airfield located near Sansapor, in Southwest Papua, Indonesia.  It is abandoned and overgrown, disused since 1944.

History
The airfield was used during the Sansapor-Cape Opmarai Operation, 30 July-31 August 1944 in northern Dutch New Guinea.  On 30 July, a task force comprising elements of the United States Army 6th Division made simultaneous and unopposed landings near Cape Opmarai on the mainland, and on Middelburg and Amsterdam Islands to the northwest. Only a few enemy stragglers were encountered. The next day a shore-to shore landing from Cape Opmarai was carried out at Sansapor.

As in other New Guinea areas, airdrome construction proceeded rapidly. In a short time airfields at Cape Opmarai and on Middelburg Island and a float plane base at Amsterdam Island were fully operative.   The airfield was used as a tactical fighter strip, then abandoned after MacArthur moved into the Dutch East Indies on his drive to the Philippines.

References

External links

Airports in Southwest Papua 
Airfields of the United States Army Air Forces in the South West Pacific theatre of World War II
World War II sites in Indonesia